María Trujillo Tenorio de Rios (born October 19, 1959) is a retired female marathon runner from Mexico, who later represented the United States. She won the gold medal in the women's marathon at the 1995 Pan American Games. She represented Mexico at the 1984 Summer Olympics in Los Angeles, California, finishing in 25th place.

Maria began running at age 19 in junior college. Being one of eight children, Trujillo was concerned about her road to college success, as she was not affluent enough to afford tuition, but she was offered a scholarship to Arizona State University after winning the California Junior College 3,000-meter's title.

Maria was known for a rigorous and strict routine, running 16 - 22 miles every Saturday on incline forest trails, run 8 x 1 mile laps, timed on Tuesdays and Thursdays with a track group, and run 8-10 miles on bike paths while pushing her infant at the time, Alina.  
Maria was invited in 2018 into the Arizona hall of fame.
Trujillo won the 1986 San Francisco Marathon.

Maria Trujillo is now retired living in Los Gatos, California with her two daughters Alina and Marina Trujillo.

Achievements

References

External links
 

1959 births
Living people
American female long-distance runners
Mexican female long-distance runners
Athletes (track and field) at the 1984 Summer Olympics
Athletes (track and field) at the 1995 Pan American Games
Olympic athletes of Mexico
Pan American Games gold medalists for the United States
Pan American Games medalists in athletics (track and field)
World Athletics Championships athletes for the United States
American sportspeople of Mexican descent
Mexican emigrants to the United States
Medalists at the 1995 Pan American Games